The ING Route du Vin Half Marathon is an annual road running competition over the half marathon distance (21.1 km/13.1 mi) which takes place in late September in Remich, Luxembourg. It is organised by the Luxembourg Athletics Federation and it is a member race of the Association of International Marathons and Distance Races. It is sponsored by ING Luxembourg. 

Established in 1962, the name for the competition stems from the region's wine-making tradition (Route du Vin being the French for Wine Route). The race has had a number of different courses. In the early life of the race the course began in Schengen and finished in Wormeldange. This changed in 1975 to begin in Remich and end at Grevenmacher. The current course (with a start and finish in Remich) was first put to use in 2000. The distance of the race has also varied: it was not reliably measured for the half marathon distance until 1995. The first four editions were too long, as was the 1972 race. From 1966 to 1979, the courses were generally short and from 1979 to 1999 the times run on the course were aided by an overall downhill elevation. Since 2000, the times set on the course have been eligible for record making purposes. The course now follows a north–south loop alongside the left bank of the Moselle River and starts and ends near the centre of the town.

The race began as a men's only competition and women were first included in 1974. A total of 1358 runners took part in the event in 2013 (1062 men and 296 women). It is one of two major road running events in the country that attracts elite runners and a mass field, alongside the annual Luxembourg Marathon.

The 2009 women's winner, Shitaye Gemechu, was disqualified after testing positive for the banned blood booster EPO (making her the first Ethiopian runner to be banned for abusing that substance).

Past winners
Key:

References

List of winners
Route du Vin Half Marathon. Association of Road Racing Statisticians (2013-10-01). Retrieved on 2013-10-05.

External links
Official website

Half marathons
Athletics in Luxembourg
Recurring sporting events established in 1962
Remich
Athletics competitions in Luxembourg
Autumn events in Luxembourg